Cantrainea panamensis is a species of small sea snail with calcareous opercula, a marine gastropod mollusk in the family Colloniidae.

Description
The shell grows to a height of 20 mm.

Distribution
This species occurs in the Pacific Ocean from Baja California, Mexico to Panama

References

External links
 To Encyclopedia of Life
 To World Register of Marine Species
 

Colloniidae
Gastropods described in 1908